Qasemabad (also Romanized as Qāsemābād and Qāsimābād) is a village in Azari Rural District, in the Central District of Esfarayen County, North Khorasan Province, Iran. At the 2006 census, its population was 767, in 200 families.

References 

Populated places in Esfarayen County